Ali Marzban (born July 7, 1990) is an Iranian football player currently playing for Mes Kerman of the Iran Pro League.

Career
Marzban played for Sepahan Novin before moving to Foolad Natanz in the summer of 2010.

International
In 2010, Marzban was selected to participate in Iran U-23 football team's training camp in Poland.

References

External sources
 Profile at Persianleague

Living people
Iranian footballers
Sepahan S.C. footballers
Sepahan Novin players
Foolad Natanz players
Sanat Mes Kerman F.C. players
1990 births
Footballers at the 2010 Asian Games
Association football midfielders
Asian Games competitors for Iran